Pierre Antoine Louis Havet (6 January 1849, Paris – 26 January 1925, Paris) was a French Latinist and Hellenist, an expert on classical Greek and Latin poetry. He was the son of Ernest Havet.

He was professor at Collège de France, where in 1885-1925 he was chairman of the department of Latin philology. Since 1893 he was a member of the Académie des Inscriptions et Belles-Lettres. In 1917 he became the first vice-president of the Association Guillaume Budé.

He was a member of the central committee of the Ligue des droits de l'homme ("Human Rights League"), which defended Alfred Dreyfus in the Dreyfus affair.

Major works
 Manuel de critique verbale appliquée aux textes latins (1867)
 Cours élémentaire de métrique grecque et latine (1886)
 La Prose métrique de Symmaque et les origines métriques du Cursus (1892) Text online
 Amphitruo (Amphitryon, by Plautus) ed. L. Havet (1895) Text online
 Manuel de critique verbale appliquée aux textes latins (1911)
 Notes critiques sur le texte de Festus (1914) Text online
 Notes critiques sur l'Orator et sur Isée (1927) Text online

References 

 Langlois, Charles-Victor. 1925. “Éloge funèbre de M. Louis Havet, membre de l'Académie.” Comptes rendus des séances de l'Académie des Inscriptions et Belles-Lettres 69 (1): 17–22.
 Holleaux, Maurice. 1939. “Notice sur la vie et les travaux de M. Louis Havet, membre de l'Académie.” Comptes rendus des séances de l'Académie des Inscriptions et Belles-Lettres 83 (5): 527–546.

1849 births
1925 deaths
French philologists
Academic staff of the Collège de France
Members of the Académie des Inscriptions et Belles-Lettres
Corresponding Fellows of the British Academy